The Philippine Fencing Association (PFA) is the governing body for the sport of fencing in the Philippines and is recognized by the Philippine Olympic Committee (POC) as one of its National Sports Association members. Founded by Don Francisco Dayrit Sr. as Philippine Amateur Fencers Association or PAFA, PFA is a member of the Fédération Internationale d'Escrime (FIE) and one of the founding members of the Southeast Asian Fencing Federation (SEAFF) and the Asian Fencing Confederation (AFC).

References

External links
Philippine Amateur Fencers Association profile at the Philippine Olympic Committee website

National members of the Asian Fencing Confederation
Fencing in the Philippines
Fencing